is a Japanese animator and director. He is best known for directing Mushishi.

Career 
Hiroshi Nagahama started his career at Madhouse Studio as a mechanical designer for The Cockpit, and was also a part of the production staff for Azuki-chan and Yawara!. After leaving Madhouse Studio, he became a freelancer and worked on the conceptual design for the Revolutionary Girl Utena series. He has also worked as the storyboard writer and animation director for Sexy Commando Gaiden: Sugoiyo! Masaru-san and Ojarumaru. Nagahama has been involved with the production of Doraemon: Nobita and the Windmasters,  Pokémon Heroes,  Fruits Basket,  Kimi ni Todoke,  and X-Men. He directed the highly acclaimed Mushishi,  Detroit Metal City, The Flowers of Evil and Hatsune Miku music videos "Downloader" and "Chime".

Filmography

As director
 Jubei-chan 2: Siberia Yagyuu no Gyakushuu (2004)
 Mushishi (2005)
 Detroit Metal City (2009)
 The Flowers of Evil (2013) 
 Mushishi -Next Passage- (2014)
 Mushishi -Next Passage-: Path of Thorns (2014)
 Mushishi -Next Passage-: Bell Droplets (2015)
 The Reflection (2017)
 Uzumaki (TBA)

Episode director
 Fruits Basket (2001) (episodes 18 and 25)
 Gag Manga Biyori 2 (2006)
 School Rumble (2004) (episode 3)

References

External links

 
 

Anime directors
Living people
1970 births